Tiger and Turtle – Magic Mountain is an art installation and landmark in Duisburg, Germany, built in 2011. It was designed by Ulrich Genth and Heike Mutter. It resembles a roller coaster, but it is a walkway with stairs. Its vertical loop continues the walkway and stairs, but it is unwalkable and is blocked off. In 2013, Tiger and Turtle – Magic Mountain was ranked as #6 on HuffPost's list of Most Extreme Staircases.

References

External links

Buildings and structures in Duisburg
Culture in Duisburg
Stairways